The CP-200 was a Brazilian home computer produced by Prológica in 1982.

It was compatible in software and hardware with the British Sinclair ZX81, although it was a less literal copy than the competing machines (TK82C and TK83), produced by Microdigital. There were two models of CP200, very similar cabinets, but model 1 had the Prológica logo in high relief and a slightly smaller cabinet, while model 2 had a logo plate in the same position.

Prológica later redesigned the cabinet, added a video monitor output, external power supply, and relaunched the product as CP200S.

Bibliography 
HURLEY, Linda. Programas para jovens programadores: TK82-83-85 CP200. São Paulo: McGraw-Hill, 1984.

References 

Prológica computers 
Computer-related introductions in 1982
Goods manufactured in Brazil
Personal computers
Products introduced in 1982
Sinclair ZX81 clones